Events from the year 1978 in art.

Events
 27 June – Stitching the Standard by Edmund Leighton is sold at Sotheby's in Belgravia to a private collector.

Awards
 Archibald Prize: Brett Whiteley – Art, Life and the other thing
 John Moores Painting Prize - Noel Forster for "A painting in six stages with a silk triangle"

Works

 Zdzisław Beksiński – AA78
 Christo and Jeanne Claude - "Wrapped Walk Ways" in Loose Park in Kansas City, Missouri
 Dan Flavin – untitled (to the real Dan Hill)
 Helen Frankenthaler – Cleveland Symphony Orchestra
 David Gentleman – "Eleanor cross" mural for Charing Cross tube station (London)
 Jack Goldstein – The Jump
 Michael Heizer – Isolated Mass/Circumflex (Number 2) (land art, Houston, Texas)
 Bryan Hunt – Big Twist (bronze, Houston, Texas)
 Nabil Kanso – Hiroshima Nagasaki One-Minute
 Liz Leyh – Concrete Cows (Milton Keynes)
 Odd Nerdrum – The Murder of Andreas Baader
 Dennis Oppenheim – Cobalt Vectors – An Invasion
 Mikhail Savitsky – Partisan Madonna of Minsk

Births
 19 September – Russell Ouellett, American artist and therapist.

Deaths
 1 January – Don Freeman, American author, painter and illustrator (b. 1908)
 10 January – Gluck, born Hannah Gluckstein, English painter (b. 1895)
 19 January – Živko Stojsavljević, Serbian painter (b. 1900).
 24 February – Alma Thomas, African American abstract expressionist painter (b. 1891).
 13 April – Jack Chambers, Canadian artist and filmmaker (b. 1931).
 8 May – Duncan Grant, Scottish painter (b. 1885).
 31 May – Hannah Höch, German Dada photomontage artist (b. 1889).
 13 July 
Thomas B. Hess, American art editor, writer, and curator (b. 1920)
Oliver Messel, English-born stage designer (b. 1904).
 5 August – Victor Hasselblad, Swedish inventor and photographer (b. 1889).
 14 August – Nicolas Bentley, British author and illustrator (b. 1907).
 27 August – Gordon Matta-Clark, American artist (b. 1943).
 6 November – Harry Bertoia, Italian-born American artist and designer (b. 1915).
 8 November – Norman Rockwell, American painter and illustrator (b. 1894).
 20 November – Giorgio de Chirico, Greek-Italian painter (b. 1888).

Full date unknown
 Gabriel Hayes, Irish sculptor and coin designer (b.1909).
 Leo Michelson, Latvian-American painter and sculptor (b.1887).

References

See also
 1978 in fine arts of the Soviet Union

 
Years of the 20th century in art
1970s in art